

Current listings

|}

References

Adams County, Washington
 
Adams